Swimming at the 1964 Summer Paralympics consisted of 62 events, 31 for men, 30 for women and 1 mixed.

The wrong reports

Since at the dawn of the Paralympic Games there was no precision in reporting the results of the competitions, the Israeli athlete Michal Escapa was indicated with the Italian nationality and without prename (and so she is mentioned in the International Paralympic Committee of the Italian Paralympic Committee web sites) for the reports of the Swimming at the 1964 Summer Paralympics where she won two bronze medals, simply reported as Escapa and not as Michal Escapa. However, as can be seen from a 1968 Israeli newspaper reporting an interview with the athlete, she was the same athlete who had won medals in swimming and table tennis in Tokyo 1964.

Participating nations

Results

Men's events

Women's events

Mixed events

Medal table
Source and with the displacement of two bronze medals from Italy to Israel due to the Michal Escapa case documented in the first section of this article.

References

External links
 Results Archive Tokyo 1964 - Swimming at Paralympic.org

1964 Summer Paralympics events
1964
Paralympics